Sigrid Borge (born 3 December 1995 in Hausvik) is a Norwegian athlete specialising in the javelin throw. She represented her country at the 2017 World Championships without qualifying for the final.

Her personal best in the event is 63.28 metres set at Nadderud stadion in 2017.

International competitions

References

1995 births
Living people
Norwegian female javelin throwers
World Athletics Championships athletes for Norway
People from Osterøy
Sportspeople from Vestland